Wadsworth is a city in Medina County, Ohio, United States. It is counted as part of the Cleveland metropolitan area, although it functions mainly as a suburb of Akron. Founded on March 1, 1814, the city was named after General Elijah Wadsworth, a Revolutionary War hero and War of 1812 officer who owned the largest share of the lands that became Medina County, Ohio. The population was 24,007 at the 2020 census.

A post office called Wadsworth has been in operation since 1823.

Geography 
It is located just a few miles south of the Saint Lawrence River Divide.

Nearby cities include Akron and Cleveland.

Demographics 

As of 2000, the median income for a household in the city was $48,605, and the median income for a family was $58,850. Males had a median income of $41,626 versus $25,805 for females. The per capita income for the city was $22,859. 5.4% of the population and 4.2% of families were below the poverty line, including 5.7% of those under the age of 18 and 5.6% of those 65 and older.

2010 census
As of the census of 2010, there were 21,567 people, 8,609 households, and 5,803 families residing in the city. The racial makeup of the city was 96.9% White, 0.8% African American, 0.2% Native American, 0.7% Asian, 0.2% from other races, and 1.1% from two or more races. Hispanic or Latino people of any race were 1.2% of the population.

There were 8,609 households, of which 33.8% had children under the age of 18 living with them, 54.2% were married couples living together, 9.6% had a female householder with no husband present, 3.6% had a male householder with no wife present, and 32.6% were non-families. 28.0% of all households were made up of individuals, and 12.6% had someone living alone who was 65 years of age or older. The average household size was 2.48 and the average family size was 3.05.

The median age in the city was 38.7 years. 25.6% of residents were under the age of 18; 7.3% were between the ages of 18 and 24; 26.2% were from 25 to 44; 25% were from 45 to 64; and 15.8% were 65 years of age or older. The gender makeup of the city was 48.1% male and 51.9% female.

Of the city's population over the age of 25, 31.2% held a bachelor's degree or higher.

Education
The Wadsworth City School District is the single largest employer in the city. The district has benefited from the support of the community, which passed six of the last seven levies put before the voters. In addition, the district voters supported the recent Medina County Sales Tax (the first in Ohio), at a rate of 74% for the levy. According to school district Treasurer Doug Beeman, revenues for the fiscal year ending June 30, 2007, exceeded expenditures as the school system continues to manage the resources provided by the community.

Wadsworth High School and Wadsworth Middle School are members of the Ohio High School Athletic Association. The high school and middle school mascot is the grizzly bear.

Wadsworth City School district operates eight schools. There are five elementary schools (kindergarten through grade 4), one intermediate school (grades 5 and 6), one middle school (grades 7 and 8) and one high school (grades 9 through 12). As of 2012, Wadsworth City Schools had completed a construction project in which a $115 million high school was built, along with three new elementary buildings. The total enrollment is approximately 4,849 students.

Other schools in the city of Wadsworth include Sacred Heart School, a Roman Catholic parochial school serving Kindergarten through 8th grade.

Media
Wadsworth is served by a daily newspaper, The Medina County Gazette which is published every day of the week except Sundays and a free weekly newspaper, The Wadsworth Post which is published every Saturday. In addition, the Akron Beacon Journal and the Cleveland Plain Dealer occasionally cover the city and Medina County. Wadsworth is served by numerous television and radioI stations from both the Greater Cleveland, Greater Akron and Greater Canton areas.

Transportation
Wadsworth is served by the Wadsworth Municipal Airport, which is located 2 miles (3.22 km) southwest of the city. Skypark Airport is located 2 miles west of the city.I-76 traverses the city. State routes include OH-57, OH-94 and OH-261.

Blue Tip Festival
The Blue Tip Festival is a five-day celebration of the Wadsworth community.  It starts with a parade and the lighting of a 20-foot-high blue-tip match, which lights downtown Wadsworth during the festival's duration.  The festival offers amusement rides, festival foods, midway games, contests, a local merchant's tent, and other entertainment.  Additional events, such as the Wadsworth Running Club's "Matchstick 4 Mile" foot race and the "Blue Tip Idol" singing contest, challenge area athletes and performers.  Special events have included passenger train rides on the Blue Tip Express, Community Challenges between local organizations, big top circus performances, paint ball shooting ranges, pony rides, bingo tents, and assorted musical performances. 2017 marked the 45th annual Blue Tip Festival.

The festival is named after the historic strike-anywhere blue tip matches which were once manufactured in Wadsworth.  While match manufacturing left Wadsworth in the 1980s, the Blue Tip Festival uses the name and giant match to affirm the community's past and celebrate the modern American city. The festival is now run by a non-profit organization, staffed entirely by volunteers, referred to as the Blue Tip Festival Committee.  Revenues from the festival are donated to Wadsworth area non-profit groups.

Notable people
 Dwier Brown, actor in Field of Dreams
 Nancy Everhard, actress
 Scott Fletcher, MLB infielder
 Michael Foreman, astronaut
 Ben Hess, NASCAR driver.
 Drew Pearson, Grammy Award-nominated songwriter
 Alban W. Purcell, 19th Century stage actor
 James Renacci, former U.S. Congressman (2011-2019) and U.S. Senatorial Candidate (2018)
 Laura Spelman Rockefeller, wife of Standard Oil co-founder John D. Rockefeller
 Bishop Sankey, NFL running back
 Andy Sonnanstine, MLB pitcher
 Steven Sweet, drummer for the band Warrant (American band)
 Wilbur H. Tousley, Wisconsin State Assembly and newspaper publisher
 Carolyn Treffinger, children's author
 Brad Warner, zen monk, author, and musician

See also
 Wadsworth Public Library

References

External links
 The Official City of Wadsworth website

 
Cities in Ohio
Cities in Medina County, Ohio
Populated places established in 1814
1814 establishments in Ohio